Reynolds High School may refer to:

United Kingdom
 Reynolds High School (Acton), now Ark Acton Academy, London Borough of Ealing, England

United States
 A. C. Reynolds High School, Asheville, North Carolina
 Richard J. Reynolds High School, Winston-Salem, North Carolina
 Reynolds High School (Troutdale, Oregon)
 Reynolds Junior/Senior High School, in the Reynolds School District, Greenville, Pennsylvania